Andrew Clive Simpson is a British Computer Scientist. He is Director of Studies, Software Engineering Programme at University of Oxford. He is Governing Body Fellow of Kellogg College.

Biography

He obtained first class BSc (Hons) in Computer Science from University of Wales, Swansea (1989–1992); followed by MSc in Computation (1992–1993) and DPhil in Computation (1993–1996) from University of Oxford.

Career
Before his current post he was research officer in Oxford University Computing Laboratory (now the Oxford University Department of Computer Science)(1996–1999) and  Principal Lecturer in Computing at Oxford Brookes University (1999–2001).

Publications
Andrew Simpson's publications covers a wide range of topics covering Software Engineering, Computational Biology, Security, and Formal Methods.

References

Members of the Department of Computer Science, University of Oxford
Fellows of Kellogg College, Oxford
British computer scientists
Living people
Academics of Oxford Brookes University
Alumni of Swansea University
Alumni of the University of Oxford
Year of birth missing (living people)